Bely Kolodez , rural localities in Russia, may refer to:

 Belgorod Oblast
 Bely Kolodez, Novooskolsky District, Belgorod Oblast, a khutor
 Bely Kolodez, Shebekinsky District, Belgorod Oblast, a selo
 Bely Kolodez, Veydelevsky District, Belgorod Oblast, a selo

 Bryansk Oblast
 Bely Kolodez, Bryansk Oblast, a selo

 Kursk Oblast
 Bely Kolodez, Dmitriyevsky District, Kursk Oblast, a settlement
 Bely Kolodez, Manturovsky District, Kursk Oblast, a village
 Bely Kolodez, Medvensky District, Kursk Oblast, a selo
 Bely Kolodez, Shchigrovsky District, Kursk Oblast, a settlement
 Bely Kolodez, Zolotukhinsky District, Kursk Oblast, a selo

 Orjol Oblast
 Bely Kolodez Pervy, a village
 Bely Kolodez Vtoroy, a village

 Rostov Oblast
 Bely Kolodez, Rostov Oblast, a khutor

 Tula Oblast
 Bely Kolodez, Arsenyevsky District, Tula Oblast, a selo
 Bely Kolodez, Volovsky District, Tula Oblast, a settlement

 Voronezh Oblast
 Bely Kolodez, Voronezh Oblast, a khutor